Kya Yehi Pyaar Hai is a 2002 Indian Hindi-language musical romantic drama film directed by K. Murali Mohana Rao, starring Jackie Shroff, Aftab Shivdasani and Ameesha Patel in lead roles, with cinematography by Chota K. Naidu. It is a remake of the 1997 Tamil film, Love Today.

Plot 

Rahul Tiwari (Aftab Shivdasani) is in love with Sandhya Patil (Amisha Patel) — and has been for the last four years without having the courage to tell her. He follows her everywhere, even waiting to board the public bus until she has. Sandhya is not even aware of Rahul, let alone his affection for her. One day, Rahul finds out where Sandhya lives along with the fact that her father is Police Inspector Raj Patil "Raja" (Ashish Vidyarthi), a cruel, sadistic, drunk, and an abusive man whose wife Rachna (Neena Kulkarni) and daughter live in fear, even in his absence. Raj Patil has no respect for any human being regardless of them being his superiors, his subordinates, or even members of the public whom he has sworn to protect. When Raj finds out that Rahul is trying to enter the life of his daughter, he arrests him publicly, beats him up, and locks him in a cell in his police station.

Rahul's brother, Dr. Kamlakar Tiwari (Jackie Shroff), arranges to get him out of jail with the help of Raj's friends. Kamlakar hopes that this situation will have taught Rahul a lesson. However, it is of no avail as Rahul continues obsessing over Sandhya regardless of her indifference. Indeed, Sandhya has made it clear to Rahul and his college friend, Anupama Verma, that she is only interested in pursuing her education and not interested in him at all. Fearing Rahul's next move, Raj tells his wife and daughter that they are to leave the city immediately and move to Hyderabad where his older sister resides, only to change his mind on the bus. Not being aware of this change of plan, Rahul heads to Hyderabad to seek Sandhya. Kamlakar, who is in the hospital, finds out that a man committed suicide by consuming poison due to his girlfriend rejecting him. After finding out about this, Kamlakar is driving his car to find Rahul and stop him from going to Hyderabad and while driving, he is worried about Rahul committing suicide by taking poison just like the man from the hospital did. As a result of the distraction, Kamlakar, himself, dies in a car accident. Rahul eventually rushes home upon finding out about his older brother's death, only to see that he has just missed Kamlakar's cremation. Distraught, Rahul soon realizes that he has sacrificed four years of his life as well as his brother on one-sided feelings. When Sandhya is forced to confess her 'love' for Rahul, after Neha forces her, he rejects her so that both of them could focus on their future as Sandhya always wanted to.

Cast
 Aftab Shivdasani as Rahul Tiwari
 Amisha Patel as Sandhya Patil
 Jackie Shroff as Kamlakar Tiwari
 Ashish Vidyarthi as Raj Patil 'Raja'
 Neena Kulkarni as Rachna
 Anupama Verma as Neha
 Vrajesh Hirjee as Sundar
 Sarfaraz Khan as Peter

Soundtrack

All music composer by Sajid–Wajid and lyrics by Jalees Sherwani.

Critical response
Taran Adarsh of Bollywood Hungama gave the film 1 star out of 5, writing: "On the whole, KYA YEHI PYAAR HAI is a weak film in all respects and despite the excellent promotion by its producers, the film will not find many takers. Below average." Sukanya Verma of Rediff.com wrote: "Aftab is likeable as the infatuated college kid; a tad out of place in the heavy duty emotional scenes. Amisha Patel looks like a dream, but her tendency to mouth dialogues as if she were reciting Shakespeare's sonnets are not amusing. Jackie Shroff takes over every scene he appears in with charm and grace. At times irritatingly loud and comical at others, Ashish Vidhyarti evokes mixed feelings. However, decent performances do not a film make."

References

External links 
 

2002 films
2000s Hindi-language films
Hindi remakes of Tamil films
Geetha Arts films
Indian romantic drama films
2002 romantic drama films